Slate Creek may refer to:

Canada
Slate Creek (British Columbia)

United States
Slate Creek (Alaska), a creek with an archaeological site in Nenana Valley, Alaska
Slate Creek (Idaho), outflow of Ocalkens Lake in Custer County
Slate Creek (North Yuba River), a tributary of the Yuba River in California
Slate Creek (Pescadero Creek), in California
Slate Creek (Rapid Creek), a stream in South Dakota
Slate Creek (Virginia), a river in Virginia